The 1840 United States presidential election in New York took place between October 30 and December 2, 1840, as part of the 1840 United States presidential election. Voters chose 42 representatives, or electors to the Electoral College, who voted for President and Vice President.

New York voted for the Whig candidate, William Henry Harrison, over Democratic candidate Martin Van Buren. Harrison won New York by a narrow margin of 3.00%.

Results

See also
 United States presidential elections in New York

References

New York
1840
1840 New York (state) elections